The 2nd Critics' Choice Television Awards ceremony, presented by the Broadcast Television Journalists Association (BTJA), honored the best in primetime television programming from June 1, 2011, until May 31, 2012, and was held on June 18, 2012, at The Beverly Hilton in Los Angeles, California. The nominations were announced on June 5, 2012.

Winners and nominees
Winners are listed first and highlighted in boldface:

Shows with multiple wins
The following shows received multiple awards:

Shows with multiple nominations
The following shows received multiple nominations:

References

2012 television awards
2012 in American television
 002
2012 in Los Angeles
June 2012 events in the United States